St Martins Property Investments Limited (trading as St Martins Property Group) is a property development, investment and asset management company based in the United Kingdom representing the real estate interests of the State of Kuwait with their headquarters in London Bridge City, London. The company is wholly owned by the Kuwait sovereign wealth fund, Future Generations Fund.

Their flagship development projects are London Bridge City, an office area, and 150 Cheapside. St Martins Property Group has operations in the United Kingdom, Continental Europe including Turkey, Japan and Australia.

History

Early years
The Company was incorporated in February 1924 as The St Martins-Le-Grand Property Company Limited to carry on the business of property investment.

The company started to expand after the war years and in 1947 it merged with the Cheapside Land Development Company Limited which owned a number of London office properties. The Company then acquired Porkellis Property & General Investment Trust Limited in 1954, further expanding the portfolio of office investments.

Rapid growth was to follow after 1956, with the acquisition of a number of property companies including London & Northern Properties Limited, introducing significant portfolios of investment properties and development sites. It was during this period that the name of the Company was changed to St Martins Property Corporation Limited.

Organic growth
In addition to growth by acquisition, the company embarked on an extensive programme of property development and during the 1960s and 70's many schemes were completed including Kings Mall Shopping Centre at Hammersmith, which was later sold in 2011.

Kuwaiti ownership
In 1974 Kuwait purchased the St Martin's Property Corporation outright.

During the 1980s the company expanded its portfolio with the completion of major office, retail and warehousing schemes including London Bridge City, Windmill Hill Business Park in Swindon, the Drummond Centre in Croydon, Monument Mall Newcastle, Cathedral Lanes Coventry, Fieldhead Business Centre Bradford and Elliots Field Retail Park at Rugby. All properties except for London Bridge City and the Windmill Hill Business Park were disposed of during 2011.

Further acquisitions
In March 2007 St Martins completed the purchase of one of Europe's largest shopping centres, Cevahir Mall, in Istanbul.

St Martins acquired a new-build office building at 51 Lime Street in the City of London in June 2008. This building was later renamed the Willis Building as it is the UK headquarters of insurers The Willis Group. Designed by architect Norman Foster, the Willis Building is located in the centre of the City opposite the Lloyd's building. It is one of the tallest buildings in the City, with 45,615 sq m of space on 29 floors, together with a 10-storey building on 25 Fenchurch Avenue.

St Martins then purchased the 27-storey luxury residential tower Lietocourt Arx Tower in Minato, Chuo-Ku, adjacent to Nihonbashi and Ginza, Tokyo's business and retail district.  This 281-apartment building in Japan was acquired in February 2009.

Restructuring
St Martins went through a restructuring of its portfolio in 2010 and 2011 when smaller assets were sold off in the UK and in Continental Europe, plus retail shopping centres in the UK. Savills ran the portfolio sales under the code name 'Project Blue'.

Re-investments
Subsequently, money has been re-invested in core property acquisitions and the company remains in an acquisitive mode. The most recent purchases are 60 Threadneedle Street and 1 Bunhill Row in the City of London in 2012, and 5 Canada Square in Canary Wharf, Docklands in January 2013. In January 2014, the More London Estate, a 13-acre complex of 11 buildings, adjacent to London Bridge City, was acquired in one of the UK's largest-ever transactions. The land for this was in their ownership once before, and added 2.1m sq ft to St Martins property Corporation's portfolio.

In December 2011, 60 Threadneedle Street was acquired from Hammerson. The building completed in 2009

1 Bunhill Row was bought in February 2012.

In 2013, St Martins Property Group bought the 13 acre More London (London Bridge City) estate for around £1.7bn.

Current operations

St Martins has also historically had various holdings in Perth.

The property at 5 Canada Square is let to Credit Suisse, which sublets 10 floors to the Bank of America.

The company owns a significant amount of property in the City of London. The last successfully completed development was the  landmark office building at 150 Cheapside, adjacent to St Paul's Cathedral, and is fully let.

Former operations
The company is currently undergoing a restructuring, selling and having sold smaller, older non-core properties and non-office stock in the UK and in Continental Europe, whilst pursuing sizeable (£100m+)quality investment opportunities in Central London first of all, and subsequently also in the largest cities in developed markets.

The property at 5 Cheapside, by the entrance to St Paul's underground station and located next to One New Change, was sold off to Lord Sugar’s property company Amsprop in 2012 for £20m.

See also
Government of Kuwait

References

External links

 
Property companies of the United Kingdom
Real estate companies established in 1924
1924 establishments in England